Rita Jenrette (née Carpenter) is an American actress, television journalist, and real estate executive. She gave an interview to The New York Times about her work in restoring the Casino dell'Aurora of the Villa Ludovisi and in making it open to the public.

Education
Jenrette earned her Bachelor's degree in history, cum laude, from the University of Texas in 1971.

Career

Politics
In 1973, she became the director of research for the Republican Party of Texas. In 1974, Jenrette was a visiting lecturer at the Taft Political Institute at Trinity University. In 1975, she was Opposition research Director of the Republican National Committee, under the chairmanship of Mary Louise Smith. On September 10, 1976, she married freshman Democratic whip John Jenrette of South Carolina, 18 months after meeting him on Capitol Hill.

In 1977, Jenrette worked as a research associate at the Office of Technology Assessment then under the co-chairmanship of Senators Hubert H. Humphrey and Edward M. Kennedy. She co-authored a report with Ray Hoehle on the Food for Peace program, which was presented to the Presidential Commission on World Food Hunger.

In 1978, Jenrette was picked by the Washington Post Sunday magazine as one of four dynamic young women of Washington, D.C.

Entertainment
She was a Clairol model.

She has written two published books. My Capitol Secrets appeared in 1981 and detailed her experiences as a Congressional spouse. Conglomerate, an online romance novel, was published in 1985. She reports that Roger Ailes offered her a position as a Washington television correspondent, but she declined.

In 1982, Jenrette received the Drama-Logue Critics Award for her performance in The Philadelphia Story. She also appeared in several plays, movies like Zombie Island Massacre (1984), and television series like Fantasy Island in the mid-1980s.

In 1986, she appeared in an episode of "Lifestyles of the Rich and Famous." This led in 1989 to Jenrette's becoming an on-air journalist on Fox television’s A Current Affair where she interviewed celebrities.

Real estate

In 1994, she began a career in real estate. In 1996, Crain's New York Business described Jenrette as a "Power Broker New York Style." In 1999, she sued Simon Properties for $6 million for failing to pay her a commission on the $800 million sale of the General Motors Building to Donald Trump; the parties agreed to a settlement before the case went to trial. In 2003, she completed an Executive Management Program at Harvard Business School.

Personal life
Her husband John was convicted for taking a bribe during the Abscam investigation in October 1980. She appeared on the Phil Donahue Show and he called in live to join the conversation. At his trial, she testified in her husband's defense.

Subsequently, she alerted authorities to $25,000 she found in her husband's closet, saying it was part of the Abscam money.

She gave an interview to Playboy that appeared in the April 1981 issue, accompanied by a nude pictorial. The article's revelation that she and her husband had sex on the steps of the U.S. Capitol during a break in an all-night House session caused a hoopla. She claimed that the couple were still "happily married" at the time the Playboy pictorial was photographed, although they had separated by the time it was published. The comedy group Capitol Steps takes its name from this escapade.

Jenrette again appeared in Playboy in the May 1984 issue on the cover and in a pictorial. She separated from her husband in January 1981 and they were divorced shortly thereafter.

On May 27, 2009, Jenrette married Prince Nicolò Boncompagni Ludovisi of Piombino (1941–2018). She met him in 2003 while he was married to his second wife, Ludmilla Boncompagni Ludovisi. To commemorate the marriage with Jenrette, the prince commissioned the recreation of a fragrance originally devised for one of his ancestors. The couple lived in his 16th-century family home in Rome, called the Casino dell'Aurora, or sometimes Casino Ludovisi,  which they renovated. She still resides on the premises and has opened it to the public, giving tours and hosting charitable events there. She has promoted new research on the history of the property as well as the creation of a related scholarly resource, the Archivio Digitale Boncompagni Ludovisi.

She put the villa up for auction to be sold on January 18, 2022 for €350 million. It went unsold. It is to be put up for auction again at a slightly lower price. It contains the world's only ceiling mural by Caravaggio. To settle an inheritance dispute, an Italian judge ordered Villa Aurora to be offered at auction in January 2022 for $531 million, but it attracted no bidders.

Filmography
Jenrette appeared in the following films and television shows:

References

External links

 

Actresses from San Antonio
American expatriates in Italy
American film actresses
American real estate brokers
American stage actresses
American television reporters and correspondents
American women in business
American women television journalists
Female models from Texas
Harvard Business School alumni
Journalists from Texas
Living people
People from San Antonio
University of Texas at Austin alumni
21st-century American women
Year of birth missing (living people)